Hiding Place were a rock band from East Kilbride, Scotland.

History
The band comprised singer Paul McCallion, guitarists JayJay and Del Robertson Somerville, and Doug Smith, with Pitchshifter drummer Jason Bowld joining in 2004.

The band's debut release was the At One Time or Another EP in 2004. They toured in support of InMe and released "(What if) the Truth Looks Clearer Empty" later that year. They toured with The Rasmus and opened for Metallica, and "Cruel Kindness" followed in November 2004.

McCallion and Bowles were also part of the 'supergroup' This Is Menace, along with members of Pitchshifter, Therapy?, Hundred Reasons, Funeral for a Friend and Carcass.

Singles/EPs/Albums

At One Time Or Another EP
 Release date: 2004-03-22
CD (82876607592):
 "No Cure"
 "Slave Trade"
 "Fear And Loathing"
 "At One Time Or Another"

(What If) The Truth Looks Clearer Empty
 Release date: 2004-06-28
CD (82876619682):
 "(What If) The Truth Looks Clearer Empty"
 "Unreal"
 "Dark Eyes And Red Tears"
 "(What If)..." (Video)

Cruel Kindness
 Release date: 2004-11-08
7" (82876657807):
 "Cruel Kindness"
 "(What If) The Truth Looks Clearer Empty (Live XFM Session)"
CD (82876657802):
 "Cruel Kindness"
 "Broken Bridges"
 "Don't Fear The Reaper"
 "Cruel Kindness" (Video)

Secrets and Passers-by
 Release date:
 "Cruel Kindness"
 "The Ghost of You"
 "Reality"
 "Dark Eyes Red Tears"
 "Broken Bridges"
 "Dead Against You"
 "Illusion"
 "Unreal"
 "Revbrations (Acoustic)"
 "Don't Fear the Reaper"
 "(Hidden bonus track)"

References

External links
 The band's MySpace page

Scottish rock music groups